Endotricha trichophoralis is a species of snout moth in the genus Endotricha. It was described by George Hampson in 1906, and is known from Malaysia, Singapore and Borneo.

References

Moths described in 1906
Endotrichini